The Joker is a steel roller coaster at Six Flags Discovery Kingdom in Vallejo, California. The ride opened on May 29, 2016, as a rebuild of former wooden roller coaster Roar, adding a new steel track on top of Roar's wooden support structure. This hybrid configuration was implemented by Rocky Mountain Construction and is themed to the Joker, a comic book character villain featured in DC Comics publications. The original Roar roller coaster was constructed by Great Coasters International and opened in 1999.

History
Roar was a roller coaster at Six Flags Discovery Kingdom constructed by Great Coasters International. When it debuted on May 14, 1999, Roar was the park's first wooden roller coaster and one of its first rides overall during the transition of adding amusement park rides to the marine mammal park.

In July 2015, Six Flags announced plans to permanently close Roar on August 16, 2015. On September 3, 2015, the park revealed plans to resurrect and convert Roar into a steel-tracked coaster called The Joker for the 2016 season. Rocky Mountain Construction was contracted to perform the renovation using the company's patented I-Box steel track technology married to the existing wooden support structure. The wood-steel hybrid was designed to incorporate three inversions, including a new element described as a "step-up under-flip inverted roll", and it also received new trains themed to the Joker comic book character.

Based on the success of previous roller coaster conversions in its partnership with Rocky Mountain Construction, Six Flags anticipated that Roar would benefit from the overhaul and transition into The Joker. Discovery Kingdom held a soft opening, a media preview event for The Joker, on May 25, 2016. The roller coaster was well-received and opened for Memorial Day Weekend on May 29, 2016.

Characteristics

The table below compares the original Roar, with the updated Joker ride. The refurbished ride by Rocky Mountain Construction features a steeper and taller coaster, thus achieving a faster speed.

Ride experience
The Joker's trains are themed to the character widely known in the Batman comics. Each train has six cars, each seating four people with two across in two rows, for a total capacity of 24 riders per train. As the train departs the station, it enters several small 'bunny hills' and turns, reminiscent of pre-lift elements on Twisted Colossus at Six Flags Magic Mountain. It accelerates to a maximum speed of  before entering the "step-up under-flip inverted roll" element.

After turning left out of the inversion, the train goes up a hill into a 180-degree stall featuring several head chopper beams. A wave turn element and several air time hills follow, along with an over-banked turn and an Asian camelback hill. The track winds sharply through another over-banked turn before entering the final inversion, a zero-g-roll. Finally, the train undergoes another banked turn and camelback hill before reaching the final brake run and returning to the station.

References

External links

 
 Joker at Rocky Mountain Construction

Hybrid roller coasters
Roller coasters in California
Roller coasters operated by Six Flags
Six Flags Discovery Kingdom
Steel roller coasters
Roller coasters introduced in 2016
Joker (character) in other media